Yefri Reyes may refer to:

 Yefri Reyes (footballer, born 1995), Dominican defender
 Yefri Reyes (footballer, born 1996), Venezuelan midfielder